Steven Webster is an American businessman and conservative donor.

Personal life and education
Webster graduated from Purdue University in 1973, and earned an MBA from Harvard Business School in 1975.

Career
Webster founded Falcon Drilling, an inland barge drilling contractor in 1988. Webster grew the company as CEO, eventually leading a merger to create R&B Falcon Holdings. Webster co-founded Avista Capital Holdings in 2005. He remains a co-managing partner, in charge of all investments in the energy sector. Webster also serves as President of Peregrine Management.

Political activities
Webster donated $1,000,000 to Restore Our Future, Mitt Romney's Super PAC. Webster has also supported the NRSC, Pat Toomey, David Vitter, and other Republican politicians.

References

Living people
American chief executives
American philanthropists
Harvard Business School alumni
Purdue University alumni
Year of birth missing (living people)